Holcorhinini is a weevil tribe in the subfamily Entiminae.

Genera 
Acoenopsimorphus – Atoporhynchus – Chiloneonasus – Coenopsimorphus – Cyclobarus – Cyclomaurus – Cycloptochus – Cyrtolepus – Eptacus – Euplatinus – Holcophloeus – Holcorhinus – Nucterocephalus – Paracyclomaurus – Periteloneus – Pimelorrhinas – Ritelepus

References 

 Desbrochers, J. 1898: Monographie des Curculionides appartenant au groupe des Holcorhinidae. Le Frelon (Châteauroux), 6(7-8): 1-20, special pagination.
 Alonso-Zarazaga, M.A.; Lyal, C.H.C. 1999: A world catalogue of families and genera of Curculionoidea (Insecta: Coleoptera) (excepting Scolytidae and Platypodidae). Entomopraxis, Barcelona

External links 

Entiminae
Polyphaga tribes